Chaleh Siah (also Romanized as Chāleh Sīāh; also known as Sīkān and Sīkun) is a village in Zarrin Dasht Rural District, in the Central District of Darreh Shahr County, Ilam Province, Iran. At the 2006 census, its population was 61, in 17 families. The village is populated by Lurs.

References 

Populated places in Darreh Shahr County
Luri settlements in Ilam Province